Lucien Littlefield (August 16, 1895 – June 4, 1960) was an American actor who achieved a long career from silent films to the television era. He was noted for his versatility, playing a wide range of roles and already portraying old men before he was of voting age.

Life and career 
Lucien Littlefield was born in San Antonio, Texas and attended Staunton Military Academy. He started his movie career in 1913 and worked as an actor until his death in 1960. He usually portrayed comedic supporting characters, often much older than himself. His role of the doctor in The Cat and the Canary (1927) is one of his more notable performances. The character actor appeared with Laurel and Hardy, first as an eccentric professor in Dirty Work and finally as a veterinarian in Sons of the Desert, both made in 1933. He also played Mary Pickford's father in My Best Girl in 1927.  Other roles include the western Tumbleweeds with William S. Hart, the comedy Ruggles of Red Gap with Charles Laughton, and Johnny Come Lately with James Cagney.

He played an eccentric inventor in an early episode of Adventures of Superman titled "The Runaway Robot". Littlefield played many character roles in other TV shows of the 1950s, such as Blondie, Lassie, Dragnet and Peter Gunn.

He died of natural causes in 1960 at a veterans' hospital in Hollywood, California, and he was buried in Glendale's Forest Lawn Memorial Park Cemetery.

Selected filmography

 Rose of the Rancho (1914) (uncredited)
 The Ghost Breaker (1914) as Judge Jarvis
 The Warrens of Virginia (1915) as Tom Dabney
 A Gentleman of Leisure (1915) as Clerk
 The Wild Goose Chase (1915, short) as The 'Grind'
 Kindling (1915) as Fence (uncredited)
 The Marriage of Kitty (1915) as Minor Role
 Mr. Grex of Monte Carlo (1915) as The Rag Picker
 The Unknown (1915) as Minor Role
 The Cheat (1915) as Hardy's Secretary (uncredited)
 The Golden Chance (1915) as Roger Manning's Valet (uncredited)
 Temptation (1915) (uncredited)
 The Blacklist (1916) as Frederick Holtz
 To Have and to Have (1916) as King James I
 The Love Mask (1916)
 The Heart of Nora Flynn (1916) as The Gardener
 A Gutter Magdalene (1916)
 Joan the Woman (1916)
 The Golden Fetter (1917) as Pete
 On Record (1917)
 The Cost of Hatred (1917)
 The Jaguar's Claws (1917) as Minor Role
 The Squaw Man's Son (1917) as Lord Yester
 The Hostage (1917) as Paul
 Hawthorne of the U.S.A. (1919) as Soldier on Patrol (uncredited)
 Everywoman (1919) as Lord Witness
 Double Speed (1920) as Reginald Toby
 Why Change Your Wife? (1920) as Gordon's Butler
 Jack Straw (1920) as Sherlo
 Sick Abed (1920) as Dr. Widner
 The Sins of St. Anthony (1920) as Lieutenant Humphrey Smith
 The Fourteenth Man (1920) as Wesley Colfax Winslow
 The Round-Up (1920) as Parenthesis (uncredited)
 Eyes of the Heart (1920) as Whitey
 Her First Elopement (1920) as Man with Raccoon Coat (uncredited)
 The Furnace (1920) as Bert Vallance
 Her First Elopement (1920) as Ted Maitland
 All Souls' Eve (1921)
 The Little Clown (1921) as Connie Potts
 Too Much Speed (1921) as Jimmy Rodman
 Crazy to Marry (1921) as Minister
 The Hell Diggers (1921) as Silas Hoskins
 The Affairs of Anatol (1921) as Spencer's Valet (uncredited)
 The Sheik (1921) as Gaston - French Valet
 Rent Free (1922) as 'Batty' Briggs
 Tillie (1922) as Doc Weaver
 Saturday Night (1922) as Uncle Van's Secretary (uncredited)
 Her Husband's Trademark (1922) as Slithy Winters
 Across the Continent (1922) as Scott Tyler
 Beyond the Rocks (1922) as Sir Lionel Grey's Associate (uncredited)
 Our Leading Citizen (1922) as The Editor
 The Siren Call (1922) as Irishman
 Manslaughter (1922) as Witness
 To Have and to Hold (1922) as Duke of Buckingham
 Mr. Billings Spends His Dime (1923) as Martin Green
 The Tiger's Claw (1923) as Goyrem
 Three Wise Fools (1923) as Douglas
 The French Doll (1923) as Dobbs, the Butler
 In the Palace of the King (1923) as Adonis
 The Rendezvous (1923) as Commissar
 Leap Year (1924) as Jeremiah Piper
 Name the Man (1924) as Sharf
 True As Steel (1924) as Mr. Foote
 Babbitt (1924) as Edward Littlefield
 A Woman Who Sinned (1924) as Rev. Hillburn
 Never Say Die (1924) as Griggs
 The Painted Lady (1924) as Matt Logan
 Feet of Clay (1924) as Minor Role (uncredited)
 Gerald Cranston's Lady (1924) as Stanley Tilotson
 Teeth (1924) as Under-sheriff
 Gold Heels (1924) as Push Miller
 The Deadwood Coach (1924) as Charlie Winter - in play
 Charley's Aunt (1925) as Brasset - the Scout
 Gold and the Girl (1925) as Weasel
 The Rainbow Trail (1925) as Joe Lake
 What Price Goofy? (1925, Short) as Speck - Jamison's Faithful Butler
 Hearts and Spurs (1925) as Ford Driver (uncredited)
 Innocent Husbands (1925, Short) as The House Detective
 Madame Sans Jane (1925, Short) as Steward
 There Goes the Bride (1925, Short)
 Somewhere in Somewhere (1925, Short) as The Buck Private
 Laughing Ladies (1925, Short) as The Dentist
 Tumbleweeds (1925) as Kentucky Rose
 Soul Mates (1925) as Stevens
 A Punch in the Nose (1926, Short)
 Your Husband's Past (1926, Short)
 Torrent (1926) as Cupido
 Brooding Eyes (1926) as Bell
 Tony Runs Wild (1926) as Red
 Bachelor Brides (1926) as Egbert Beamish
 Don Key (Son of Burro) (1926, Short)
 Take It from Me (1926) as Cyrus Crabb
 Twinkletoes (1926) as Hank
 Taxi! Taxi! (1927) as Billy Wallace
 The Cat and the Canary (1927) as Ira Lazar
 The Lighter That Failed (1927, Short) (uncredited)
 My Best Girl (1927) as Pa Johnson
 Uncle Tom's Cabin (1927) as Lawyer Marks
 The Small Bachelor (1927)
 Cheating Cheaters (1927) as 'Habeas Corpus' Lazarre
 The Valley of the Giants (1927) as Councilman
 A Texas Steer (1927) as Yell
 A Ship Comes In (1928) as Dan Casey
 The Man in Hobbles (1928) as Pa Harris
 A Blonde for a Night (1928) as Jenks
 Harold Teen (1928) as Dad Jenks
 The Head Man (1928) as Ed Barnes
 Heart to Heart (1928) as Uncle Joe Boyd
 Mother Knows Best (1928) as Pa Quail
 Do Your Duty (1928) as Andy McIntosh
 Making the Grade (1929) as Silas Cooper
 Clear the Decks (1929) as Plinge
 Saturday's Children (1929) as Willie
 This Is Heaven (1929) as Frank Chase
 The Girl in the Glass Cage (1929) as Sheik Smith
 Drag (1929) as Pa Parker
 Dark Streets (1929) as Census Taker
 The Great Divide (1929) as Texas Tommy
 Happy Days (1929) as Lucien Littlefield
 Seven Keys to Baldpate (1929) as Thomas Hayden
 No No Nanette (1930) as Jim Smith
 Getting a Raise (1930, Short) as Pa Potter
 Clancy in Wall Street (1930) as Andy MacIntosh
 High Society Blues (1930) as Eli Granger
 Big Money (1930, Short) as Pa Potter
 She's My Weakness (1930) as Warren Thurber
 Tom Sawyer (1930) as Schoolteacher
 Reducing (1931) as Elmer Truffle
 Scandal Sheet (1931) as Charles McCloskey
 It Pays to Advertise (1931) as Adams
 Misbehaving Ladies (1931) as Uncle Joe Boyd
 Young as You Feel (1931) as Noah Marley
 Trouble from Abroad (1931, Short) as Captain Wimble
 The Great Junction Hotel (1931, Short)
 Broken Lullaby (1932) as Herr Walter Schultz
 Strangers in Love (1932) as Professor Clark
 Are You Listening? (1932) as Fred (uncredited)
 Shopworn (1932) as Fred
 Strangers of the Evening (1932) as Frank 'Snookie' Daniels aka Richard Roe
 Jimmy's New Yacht (1932, Short) as Mr. Ford
 Miss Pinkerton (1932) as Henderson (scenes deleted)
 Speed Madness (1932) as Forbes
 Downstairs (1932) as Françoise - a Drunken Servant
 Devil and the Deep (1932) as Shopkeeper (uncredited)
 That's My Boy (1932) as Uncle Louie
 Pride of the Legion (1932) as 'Dad' Tully
 Evenings for Sale (1932) as Schwenk
 If I Had a Million (1932) as Zeb - Hamburger Stand Owner (uncredited)
 Rasputin and the Empress (1932) as Reveler at Party (uncredited)
 The Bitter Tea of General Yen (1932) as Mr. Jacobson
 That's My Baby (1932)
 Sailor's Luck (1933) as Elmer Brown
 Sweepings (1933) as Grimson
 Professional Sweetheart (1933) as Ed - the Announcer
 The Big Brain (1933) as Justice of the Peace
 Skyway (1933) as Webster
 Chance at Heaven (1933) as Fred Harris
 Dirty Work (1933, Short) as Professor Noodle (uncredited)
 East of Fifth Avenue (1933) as Gardner
 Rainbow Over Broadway (1933) as Timothy Chibbins
 Sons of the Desert (1933) as Dr. Horace Meddick, the Veterinarian
 Alice in Wonderland (1933; scene deleted)
 Mandalay (1934) as Mr. George Peters
 Stand Up and Cheer! (1934) as Professor Hi De Ho (uncredited)
 Thirty Day Princess (1934) as Parker
 Marrying Widows (1934) as The Brother-In-Law
 Kiss and Make-Up (1934) as Max Pascal
 When Strangers Meet (1934) as Barney Crane
 Gridiron Flash (1934) as L.B. Fields
 Love Time (1934) as Willie Obenbiegler
 Sweepstake Annie (1935) as Henry Foster
 Carnival (1935) as Minor Role (uncredited)
 Ruggles of Red Gap (1935) as Charles Belknap-Jackson
 One Frightened Night (1935) as Dr. Denham
 The Murder Man (1935) as Peter J. Rafferty
 Man on the Flying Trapeze (1935) as Mr. Peabody
 She Gets Her Man (1935) as Elmer
 The Return of Peter Grimm (1935) as Colonel Tom Lawton
 Cappy Ricks Returns (1935) as Skinner
 I Dream Too Much (1935) as Hubert Dilley
 Magnificent Obsession (1935) as Breezy (uncredited)
 Strike Me Pink (1936) as Professor Kittridge (uncredited)
 Rose Marie (1936) as Storekeeper
 The Moon's Our Home (1936) as Ogden Holbrook
 Let's Sing Again (1936) as Supt. Henry Perkins
 Early to Bed (1936) as Mr. O'Leary
 Hotel Haywire (1937) as Elmer (uncredited)
 Wild Money (1937) as Bill Hawkins
 High, Wide, and Handsome (1937) as Mr. Lippincott
 Souls at Sea (1937) as Toymaker
 Partners in Crime (1937) as Mr. Twitchell
 Born to the West (1937) as Cattle Buyer
 Bulldog Drummond's Revenge (1937) as Mr. Smith
 Wells Fargo (1937) as San Francisco Postmaster (uncredited)
 Scandal Street (1938) as Robert Johnson
 Hollywood Stadium Mystery (1938) as Watchman
 Reckless Living (1938) as Lucius Carr (uncredited)
 Wide Open Faces (1938) as P. T. 'Doc' Williams
 The Gladiator (1938) as Professor Abner Danner
 I Am the Law (1938) as Mr. Roberts (uncredited)
 The Night Hawk (1938) as Parrish
 Pirates of the Skies (1939) as Dr. Amos Pettingill
 Mystery Plane (1939) as Winslow
 Unmarried (1939) as School Principal (uncredited)
 What a Life (1939) as Mr. Patterson
 Sabotage (1939) as Eli
 Jeepers Creepers (1939) as Grandpa
 Money to Burn (1939) as Irving
 Those Were the Days! (1940) as Professor Sillicocks
 The Westerner (1940) as The Stranger
 Life with Henry (1940) as Mr. Stevens
 Li'l Abner (1940) as The Sheriff / Mr. Oldtimer
 Murder Among Friends (1941) as Dr. Fred Turk
 The Great American Broadcast (1941) as Justice of the Peace
 The Little Foxes (1941) as Manders
 Man at Large (1941) as Jones, Nervous Man at Tourist Camp
 Henry Aldrich for President (1941) as Mr. Crosley
 Mr. and Mrs. North (1942) as Barnes
 Castle in the Desert (1942) as Gleason
 This Time for Keeps (1942) as Herb - Western Union Man (uncredited)
 Larceny, Inc. (1942) as Third Customer (uncredited)
 The Great Man's Lady (1942) as City Editor
 Hillbilly Blitzkrieg (1942) as Prof. Waldo James
 Bells of Capistrano (1942) as Daniel (Pop) McCracken
 Whistling in Dixie (1942) as Corporal Lucken
 Silent Witness (1943) as Hank Eastman
 Henry Aldrich Gets Glamour (1943) as Mr. Quid (uncredited)
 Johnny Come Lately (1943) as Blaker
 Henry Aldrich Haunts a House (1943) as Mr. Quid
 Casanova in Burlesque (1944) as John Alden Compton
 Lady, Let's Dance (1944) as Mr. Snodgrass
 Cowboy and the Senorita (1944) as Judge Loomis
 Goodnight, Sweetheart (1944) as Collins
 When the Lights Go on Again (1944) as Andy
 One Body Too Many (1944) as Kenneth Hopkins
 Lady, Let's Dance (1944) as The Judge
 Zorro's Black Whip (1944) as 'Tenpoint' Jackson
 Scared Stiff (1945) as Charles Waldeck / Preston Waldeck
 The Caribbean Mystery (1945) as Dr. Praskins (uncredited)
 In Old Sacramento (1946) as Barber (uncredited)
 Rendezvous with Annie (1946) as Ed Kramer
 That Brennan Girl (1946) as The Florist
 Love Laughs at Andy Hardy (1946) as Telegraph Clerk (uncredited)
 The Hal Roach Comedy Carnival (1947) as The Judge, in 'Fabulous Joe'
 The Fabulous Joe (1947) as Judge
 Sweet Genevieve (1947) as Mr. Rogers
 Lightnin' in the Forest (1947) as Joad
 Jinx Money (1948) as Tipper
 Hollow Triumph (1948) as Mr. Davis (uncredited)
 Let's Live a Little (1948) as Mr. Tinker (uncredited)
 Bad Men of Tombstone (1949) as Old Man in Claims Office (uncredited)
 Susanna Pass (1949) as Russell Masters
 At Sword's Point (1952) as Cpl. Gautier (uncredited)
 Woman of the North Country (1952) as Parvin (uncredited)
 Roar of the Crowd (1953) as Josh (uncredited)
 Casanova's Big Night (1954) as First Prisoner
 Sudden Danger (1955) as Dave Glennon
 Bop Girl Goes Calypso (1957) as Prof. Winthrop
 The High Cost of Loving (1958) as Brabin (uncredited)
 Wink of an Eye (1958) as Old Man

References

External links

1895 births
1960 deaths
Male actors from Texas
American male silent film actors
American male television actors
20th-century American male actors
Burials at Forest Lawn Memorial Park (Glendale)
Metro-Goldwyn-Mayer contract players